"The Mountains of Beyond" is the 26th and final episode of the Spanish animated television series The World of David the Gnome. It originally aired on April 19, 1986, in Spain, but it aired on February 8, 1988, in the U.S. as the series finale on Nickelodeon during its Nick Jr. block.

The final episode deals with David and Lisa who are about to turn 400 years old heading off on a Journey on their fox Swift to the mountains of beyond where they will die because Gnomes can only live up to 400 years.

Plot
David and Lisa are working around their house preparing for their long journey to the mountains of beyond because their time on Earth is almost over. Lisa is sad about it but David comforts her, suddenly they hear a knock on the door. It's an arctic mouse with a message from David's friend Casper who wishes to accompany them on the long journey because his time on Earth is almost over as well and doesn't want to go alone. David and Lisa begin to leave with Lisa wearing the pendant that David gave to her when they got engaged. They let out their mice and their cricket, blow out the candles, and leave their home for the last time.

Outside they are greeted by their forest animal friends who wish them luck. David and Lisa then hop on Swift the fox and head off to the blue mountains to pick up Casper. When they arrive at Casper's house he invites them all inside for a farewell dinner before they go. When they get inside and sit down for dinner they talk about how their time is nearly over and that things never last forever, not even gnomes. They then share toasts to the many things in their lives: friendship, themselves, the gnomes who will come after them, Casper's books, their families, their future generations, their ancestors, and the humans who have been friends to the gnomes.

David, Lisa, and Casper hop on Swift to leave for the mountains of beyond and Casper says farewell to his home as it's being buried in snow. Swift manages to run through the snow and the forest until they finally reach the mountain. David and Lisa say goodbye to Swift and head up the mountain with Casper. They tell Swift to head back home once they reach the top of the mountain, but as he is leaving Swift turns back and runs up to the top of the mountain. Because although he was told to leave Swift couldn't find it in his heart to go home without seeing David and Lisa one last time. 

In the meadow, on the mountain, David and Lisa say their goodbyes to each other and pass on turning into two intertwined apple trees. Casper then passes on turning into an oak tree, all of these devastating Swift, who howls sadly. On his way home, a grief-stricken Swift meets another gnome named Christopher and his fox Agnes. Both foxes become romantically interested in each other and walk together with Christopher who says goodbye to the viewers.

The scene then cuts to the spirits of David and Lisa who also say goodbye.

Reception

Response
Anthony Ocasio of Screenrant places this episode as number 3 of The 10 most 'WTF' Television Series Finales. He also states "If you have kids, have them watch it as well. In the final moments you, along with David, Lisa, and Casper can wave goodbye... goodbye to your children’s innocence."

Lauren Vino of MTV talked about 3 things the episode taught us about life. She says that "Growing up doesn't have to be scary...," "...but saying goodbye is unbelievably sad," and "We put it all in perspective eventually." Vino states a few things about the finale, "If you watch the final episode as an adult, you'll be shocked at how chill David is about dying" and "People have argued that David and Lisa did not die, but instead turned into trees -- which is kind of like telling kids they went off to live on a farm"

Kevin L. Clark of Hip-Hop Wired places the episode as number 2 of Banned From TV: The 10 Most Controversial TV Series Finales. Clark stated that the premise of the episode is "A hard concept for children to understand, given the nice nature of the show, and made worst since neither David nor Lisa are really that interested in dying."

References 

American television series finales
1986 American television episodes
1988 American television episodes
Television episodes about death
 Television episodes about families